Charles Brooks may refer to:

 Charles Brooks (cartoonist) (1920–2011), American editorial cartoonist
 Charles Brooks (cricketer) (1927–2002), English cricketer
 Charles Brooks (trade unionist) (1915–1977), Canadian labour union activist
 Charles Brooks Jr. (1942–1982), American murderer executed in Texas
 Tony Brooks (racing driver) (Charles Anthony Standish Brooks, 1932–2022), British race car driver
 Charles E. P. Brooks, English meteorologist, for whom Cape Brooks, Antarctica, was named
 Charles Lane Brooks, American minister and Kentucky Colonel
 Charles L. Brooks III, American theoretical and computational biophysicist
 Charlie Brooks (racehorse trainer) (Charles Patrick Evelyn Brooks, born 1963), British racehorse trainer
 Charlie Brooks (cyclist) (1881–1937), British cyclist, also known as Colin Brooks
 Charlie Brooks (footballer) (1911–1980), English footballer
 Charles Timothy Brooks (1813–1883), American poet and Unitarian minister
 Charles W. Brooks (1897–1957), United States Senator from Illinois
 Shirley Brooks (Charles William Shirley Brooks, 1816–1874), British journalist and novelist
 Charles B. Brooks (1865–?), African-American inventor

See also
 Charles Brook (disambiguation)
 Charles Brooke (disambiguation)
 Charlie Brooker (born 1971), British satirist and writer
 Charlie Brooks (born 1981), British actress
 Charles Brooks House, historic house in Medford, Massachusetts
 Charles Brooks Peace Fountain, in Coventry Gardens park, Windsor, Ontario, Canada